This is a comprehensive list of Bon Jovi songs that have been officially released. The list includes songs that have been performed by the entire band. Solo projects by band members are listed separately. The list consists of mostly studio recordings; remixes and live recordings are not listed, unless the song has only been released in one of the two formats. Singles are listed as having been released on their respective album, unless the single has no associated album. Only one release is listed per song, unless the song was featured on multiple releases at the same time.

Bon Jovi